ALP or AlP  may refer to:

Science
 AlP, molecular formula for aluminium phosphide
 Alkaline phosphatase, an enzyme
 Algorithmic probability, a concept from the mathematical theory of information
 Association for Logic Programming, an association of computer programming scientists
 Axion-like particle, pseudo Nambu-Goldstone boson

Political parties
 Antigua Labour Party, in Antigua and Barbuda
 Australian Labor Party, in Australia
 Alberta Liberal Party, in Canada
 American Labor Party (defunct), in the United States

Transport
 ALP (automobile), manufactured in Belgium in 1920
 Air Alpes, a defunct French airline
 Aleppo International Airport, in Syria
 Alpine (Amtrak station), in Texas, United States
 Althorpe railway station, in North Lincolnshire, United Kingdom
 Alphington railway station in Melbourne, Australia

Other uses 
 Access Linux Platform, an operating system for mobile devices
 Aerial Ladder Platform, a type of firefighting apparatus
 Afghan Local Police
 Alien Loves Predator, a webcomic
 Anna Livia Plurabelle, character in the book Finnegans Wake
 Appliance Link Protocol used by Sun Ray computers
 Association of Lincoln Presenters, an American historical society
 Arthur Loves Plastic, American electronic music band 
 Average Labor Productivity
 IBM ALP, Assembly Language Processor, for 32-bit OS/2

See also
 Alp (disambiguation)
 Alps (disambiguation)
 ALPS (disambiguation)